The Jewish Telegraphic Agency (JTA) is an international news agency and wire service, founded in 1917, serving Jewish community newspapers and media around the world as well as non-Jewish press, with about 70 syndication clients listed on its web site.

Editorial policy 
The JTA is a not-for-profit corporation governed by an independent board of directors. It claims no allegiance to any specific branch of Judaism or political viewpoint. "We respect the many Jewish and Israel advocacy organizations out there, but JTA has a different mission — to provide readers and clients with balanced and dependable reporting", wrote JTA editor-in-chief and CEO and publisher Ami Eden. He gave as an example of the JTA's coverage of the Mavi Marmara activist ship.

JTA is an affiliate of 70 Faces Media, a not-for-profit American media company. Other sites under the 70 Faces Media company include Kveller, Alma, and Nosher.

History
The JTA was founded on February 6, 1917, by Jacob Landau (a 25 year old) as the Jewish Correspondence Bureau in The Hague, Netherlands. Its mandate was to collect and disseminate news affecting the Jewish communities around the world, especially from the European World War I  fronts. In 1919, it moved to London, under its current name.

In 1922, the JTA moved its headquarters to New York City. By 1925, over 400 newspapers (Jewish and general) subscribed to the JTA.

In November 1937, German Third Reich secret police closed the Berlin bureau of the JTA, a U.S. news bureau, charging it with "endangering public safety and order." 

In 1940, the JTA spawned the Overseas News Agency (ONA). Although designed to appear like a normal news agency, it was in fact secretly funded by the British intelligence service MI6. ONA provided press credentials to British spies, and planted fake news stories in US newspapers. Meyer Levin was a war correspondent in Europe during World War II, representing the Overseas News Agency and the JTA.

Its cable service improved the quality and range of Jewish periodicals. Today, it has correspondents in Washington, DC, Jerusalem, Moscow, and 30 other cities in North and South America, Israel, Europe, Africa, and Australia. The JTA is committed to covering news of interest to the Jewish community  with journalistic detachment.

In 2015, the news service merged with the site MyJewishLearning to create 70 Faces Media.

Staff 
Boris Smolar joined the JTA in 1924, and retired as its editor-in chief in 1967.

Journalist Daniel Schorr began his career as an assistant news editor for the JTA, from 1934 to 1941.

Haskell Cohen was the sports editor for the JTA for 17 years; he is best known for later as the NBA director of public relations creating the NBA All Star Game in 1951. Harold U. Ribalow was later the sports editor of the JTA. In the 1960s, novelist and lawyer Eleazar Lipsky was the JTA's president. 

Lillie Shultz, later a journalist and the chief administrative officer of the American Jewish Congress, was a staff member of the JTA in the early 1930s.

Reception 
In 1933, Nobel Prize winner Albert Einstein said in a speech at a dinner in his honor that the JTA was "very close to my heart", and that the JTA was keeping the public objectively informed about the lot of the Jews all countries: "in a graphic and objective manner, and in so doing it has performed an important service ..." 

In March 1942, in connection with its 25th anniversary the JTA received congratulatory messages from U.S. President Franklin D. Roosevelt ("I trust through long decades to come that this medium of information will serve the world with fidelity and courage by the widest possible dissemination of the truth"), and U.S. Secretary of War Henry Stimson, British Ambassador Lord Halifax, Director of the  U.S. Office of War Department of Facts and Figures Archibald MacLeish, Director of the U.S. Office of Government Reports Lowell Mellett, and Benjamin V. Cohen of the U.S. National Power Policy Committee.

See also
 Ron Kampeas
 Morris Iushewitz
 The Jewish Week

References

External links

Jewish media
News agencies based in the United States
Mass media companies of the United States
Non-profit organizations based in New York City
Mass media companies established in 1917
1922 establishments in New York City
1917 establishments in the Netherlands